Turið Elinborgardóttir is a Faroese beauty pageant titleholder who was crowned as Miss Earth Denmark 2015. Three weeks before the Danish beauty pageant she was crowned as Miss Universe Faroe Islands on 25 July 2015 by the mayor of Tórshavn, Heðin Mortensen. Elinborgardóttir is the first Faroese national to compete in an international pageant. A Faroese designer, Laila av Reyni, designed her dress for the Danish competition, as well as the dresses of the other Danish contestants at the Miss Universe Denmark 2015.

Miss Earth Denmark 2015
Turið was crowned Miss Earth Denmark 2015 at AC Bella Sky Hotel, Copenhagen, Denmark on 15 August 2015.

References

Living people
Miss Earth 2015 contestants
Danish beauty pageant winners
1995 births
People from Tórshavn
Faroese beauty pageant winners